Karamoko Cissé (born 14 November 1988) is a Guinean footballer who plays as a forward. Cissé also holds Italian nationality.

Biography
Born in Guinea in 1988, Cissé moved with his family to Sorisole, Italy in 2000.

Club career
After spending season 2007–08 on loan at Hellas Verona, Cissé returned to Atalanta but did not make an appearance.

AlbinoLeffe
He joined AlbinoLeffe in a co-ownership deal in January 2009, for €700,000. On the same day Federico Peluso moved to Atalanta.

In 2010–11 season, he changed the shirt number from number 8 to number.17, the traditional bad luck number in Italy.

In June 2011 AlbinoLeffe bought Cissé, Michael Cia and Dario Bergamelli outright, co-currently sold Nicola Madonna outright. In 2011–12 season he took the number 10 shirt from retired Davide Bombardini.

On 21 March 2013 Cissé signed a new one-year contract with AlbinoLeffe.

Casertana
Cissé was signed by Casertana on 5 June 2014.

Benevento
On 13 July 2015 he signed for Benevento on a two-year contract.

Verona

Loan to Carpi
On 31 January 2019, he joined Carpi on loan until the end of the 2018–19 season.

Loan to Juve Stabia
On 20 August 2019, he joined Juve Stabia on loan with an obligation to buy.

Cittadella
On 2 October 2020, Cissé signed a contract with Cittadella.

Padova
On 1 February 2021, he moved to Serie C club Padova on a 1.5-year contract.

International career
Cissé who was in the final squad and played in the qualifiers for Guinea in the Ghana 2008 African Cup of Nations. He has also been picked in the squad for the South Africa 2010 World Cup qualifiers.

Career statistics

International

International goals

References

External links
U.C. AlbinoLeffe Official Player Profile
Atalanta B.C. Official Player Profile

1988 births
Living people
People from Labé Region
Guinean emigrants to Italy
Guinean footballers
Association football forwards
Serie A players
Serie B players
Serie C players
Atalanta B.C. players
Hellas Verona F.C. players
U.C. AlbinoLeffe players
Casertana F.C. players
Benevento Calcio players
S.S.C. Bari players
A.C. Carpi players
S.S. Juve Stabia players
A.S. Cittadella players
Calcio Padova players
Guinean expatriate footballers
Guinean expatriate sportspeople in Italy
Expatriate footballers in Italy
Guinea international footballers
2008 Africa Cup of Nations players